The FIBA Saporta Cup Top Scorer, also known as the FIBA Saporta Cup Best Scorer, was an annual basketball award of the now defunct second-tier level European-wide league, the FIBA Saporta Cup. It was given to the Top Scorer throughout the FIBA Saporta Cup season.

FIBA Saporta Cup Top Scorers (1992–2002)
 Only counting the FIBA Saporta Cup Top Scorers, starting with the 1991–92 season onward.

Multiple FIBA Saporta Cup Top Scorers (1992–2002)

See also
FIBA Saporta Cup
FIBA Saporta Cup Finals
FIBA Saporta Cup Finals MVP
FIBA Saporta Cup Finals Top Scorer
FIBA Saporta Cup Records
FIBA Festivals
FIBA EuroStars

References

External links
FIBA Saporta Cup @ FIBA Europe.com
FIBA Saporta Cup Winners 
FIBA Saporta Cup @ LinguaSport.com

Top scorer
European basketball awards